Joan Williams may refer to:

Joan Manning Williams, character in Alibi (1929 film)
Joan Franks Williams (1930–2003), American composer
Ursula Vaughan Williams (Joan Ursula Penton Vaughan Williams, 1911–2007), English poet and author
Joan Williams (author) (1928–2004), American novelist
Joan C. Williams (born 1952), feminist theorist
Joan Garrick (née Williams) DC Comics character
Joan Williams (Arrowverse), Arrowverse character